Peter Roquette (born 8 October 1927) is a German mathematician working in algebraic geometry, algebra, and number theory. He was born in Königsberg.

Roquette studied in Erlangen, Berlin, and Hamburg. In 1951 he defended a dissertation at the University of Hamburg under Helmut Hasse, providing a new proof of the Riemann hypothesis for algebraic function fields over a finite field (the first proof was given by André Weil in 1940). In 1951/1952 he was an assistant at the Mathematical Research Institute at Oberwolfach and from 1952 to 1954 at the University of Munich.  From 1954 to 1956 he worked at the Institute for Advanced Study in Princeton.  In 1954 he was Privatdozent at Munich, and from 1956 to 1959 he worked in the same position at Hamburg. In 1959 he became an associate professor at the University of Saarbrucken and in the same year at the University of Tübingen. From 1967 he was professor at the Ruprecht-Karls-University of Heidelberg, where he retired in 1996.

Roquette worked on number and function fields and especially local p-adic fields. He applied the methods of model theory (nonstandard arithmetic) in number theory, joint with Abraham Robinson, with whom he worked on Mahler's theorem (on the finiteness of integral points on a curve of genus g > 0) using non-standard methods. He authored a number of works on the history of mathematics, in particular on the schools of Helmut Hasse and Emmy Noether. In 1975 Roquette was co-editor of the collected essays by Helmut Hasse.

Since 1978 Roquette is member of the Heidelberg Academy of Sciences and since 1985, the German Academy of Sciences Leopoldina.  He has an honorary doctorate from the University of Duisburg-Essen and is honorary member of the Mathematical Society of Hamburg. In 1958 he was an invited speaker at the International Congress of Mathematicians in Edinburgh (on the topic of "Some fundamental theorems on abelian function fields").

Selected publications
 Analytic theory of elliptic functions over local fields.  Vandenhoeck and Ruprecht 1970.
 With Franz Lemmermeyer (Editor): The Correspondence of Helmut Hasse and Emmy Noether 1925-1935 Göttingen State and University Library, 2006..
 with Günther Frei (Editor): Emil Artin and Helmut Hasse - correspondence 1923-1934, University of Göttingen Publisher 2008
 The Brauer-Hasse-Noether Theorem in Historical Perspective. Mathem. the-Naturwiss writings.  Class of the Heidelberg Academy of Sciences, Springer-Verlag, 2005.
 Anthony V. Geramita, Paulo Ribenboim (ed.): Collected Papers of Peter Roquette 3 volumes.  Queens Papers in Pure and Applied Mathematics Bd.118, Kingston, Ontario, Queen's University, 2002.
 With Alexander Prestel: Formally p-adic Fields. Lecture Notes in Mathematics, Springer-Verlag 1984.
 Robinson, A.; Roquette, P. On the finiteness theorem of Siegel and Mahler concerning Diophantine equations. J. Number Theory  7  (1975), 121–176.

External links

homepage

1927 births
Possibly living people
20th-century German mathematicians
21st-century German mathematicians
University of Hamburg alumni
Academic staff of the Ludwig Maximilian University of Munich
Academic staff of Saarland University
Academic staff of the University of Tübingen
Academic staff of Heidelberg University
Number theorists
Model theorists
German historians of mathematics